Santos FC is a football club based in Santos, that competes in the Campeonato Paulista,
 São Paulo's state league, and the Campeonato Brasileiro Série A or Brasileirão, Brazil's national league. The club was founded in 1912 by the initiative of three sports enthusiasts from Santos by the names of Raimundo Marques, Mário Ferraz de Campos, and Argemiro de Souza Júnior, and played its first friendly match on 23 June 1912. Initially Santos played against other local clubs in the city and state championships, but in 1959 the club became one of the founding members of the Taça Brasil, Brazil's first truly national league. As of 2022, Santos is one of only three clubs never to have been relegated from the top level of Brazilian football, the others being São Paulo, Flamengo.

Santos enjoyed a successful start in the Brasileirão, finishing runners-up in the competition's first season. In the period from 1956 to 1974, the "Peixe" team won the Brasileirão six times, including a record-consecutive five titles from 1961 to 1965, and the Campeonato Paulista 11 times. The club did not win the league again until 2002. In 1978 Santos had finished 23rd, which remains, as of 2010, the club's lowest finishing position. Santos became the first club in the world to win the continental treble during the 1962 season consisting of the Paulista, Taça Brasil, and the Copa Libertadores. In 1955, Lula was appointed manager and assembled what would later be known as the Os Santásticos. In 1961 he led the club to its first league title and repeated the feat the following four seasons when the club also won the Copa Libertadores for the first time and successfully defended the trophy once.

Newly elected president Luis Álvaro Ribeiro's appointment of Muricy Ramalho as coach and the rise of stars such as Neymar and Ganso in 2010 marked the beginning of another spell of sustained success. In 2010 Santos won the Copa do Brasil for the first time. In May 2011 Santos defeated Peñarol in the Copa Libertadores final 2–1 to win the Copa Libertadores for the first time in 49 years. The club has won the Brasileirão championship a record eight times, the Campeonato Paulista 19 times, the Copa do Brasil once, the Torneio Rio – São Paulo five times, the Copa Paulista once, the Copa Libertadores three times, the Copa CONMEBOL once, the Recopa Sudamericana once, the Intercontinental Cup twice and the Intercontinental Supercup one time.

The table details the club's achievements in the early regional championships and in all national and international first-team competitions for each completed season since the club's formation in 1912. Note that the "three points for a win" system was used for the first time in Brazil during the 1995 season. Every season from 1994 and before used a system that awarded 2 points for a win and 1-point for a draw.

Key
Especially short competitions such as the Recopa Sudamericana, Intercontinental Cup (now defunct), or FIFA Club World Cup are not generally considered to contribute towards a Double or Treble. Dashes (—) signify that the club did not qualify for the mentioned competition(s) in a season. The term "N/A", which stands for "non-available" signify that the tournament(s) did not exist during that time.

Seasons

Pre-Brasileirão era
During this period Brazil did not have a national football league. Santos competed in the championship of the São Paulo region, and competed in the Campeonato Santista twice.

Brasileirão era
In 1959, the Taça Brasil, Brazil's first national football league, was formed, with Santos among the founder members. The club continue to participate in the Paulista championship which continued alongside the Brasileirão. Clubs qualified to the Taça Brasil based on their placings in the regional championships until 1967, when it became open to all teams through the Robertão.

References
General

Notes

Specific

External links

Seasons
 
Santos